Eun Seong-soo(Hanja: 殷成洙; born 22 June 1993) is a South Korean football midfielder who plays for FC Anyang in K League 2.

Club career 
Eun joined Suwon Samsung Bluewings in 2016 and made his professional debut against Gamba Osaka in AFC Champions League on 24 February 2016.

Club career statistics

References

External links 
 

1993 births
Living people
Association football midfielders
South Korean footballers
Suwon Samsung Bluewings players
FC Anyang players
K League 1 players
K League 2 players